Bela ankae is an extinct species of sea snail, a marine gastropod mollusk in the family Mangeliidae.

Description

Distribution
This extinct marine species was found in Miocene strata in Belgium and in Upper Miocene strata in the North Sea basin.

References

 Gürs, K. A. R. L. "Neues zur Fauna und Entwicklung des Nordseebeckens im Mittel-und Obermiozän." Meyniana 53 (2001): 51-74

External links

ankae